KINT-TV (channel 26) is a television station in El Paso, Texas, United States, affiliated with the Spanish-language Univision network. It is owned by Entravision Communications alongside UniMás affiliate KTFN (channel 65). Both stations share studios on North Mesa Street/Highway 20 in northwest El Paso, while KINT-TV's transmitter is located atop the Franklin Mountains on the El Paso city limits.

History
The station first signed on the air on May 5, 1984; it was founded by a consortium of local businessmen including Larry Daniels (former manager of KROD-TV (channel 4, now KDBC-TV), and owner of KINT radio (1590 AM, now KELP and 97.5 FM, now at 93.9) as well as other businesses) and Jose Angel Silva Sr., owner of a grocery store in downtown El Paso. The consortium originally planned to assign KEHB-TV as the station's call letters, but it was changed to KINT (standing for "K-Internaciónal") prior to sign on. For many years, it was the only Spanish-language television station in the El Paso market.

El Paso is divided by a prominent natural ridge (part of the Franklin Mountains), where all of the U.S.-based television stations in the market maintain their transmitter towers and antennas. In founding the station, Daniels worked out a partnership between KDBC-TV and Larry Gallatin's two-way company. A new  self-supporting tower was put up, with channel 4 at its top, channel 26's being side-mounted, on a  tower that was long vacant (now occupied by radio station KSII (93.1 FM) and KINT-FM) and two-way space at the bottom.

News operation
KINT-TV presently broadcasts 12 hours of locally produced newscasts each week (with two hours each weekday and one hour each on Saturdays and Sundays). Newscasts for the Midland–Odessa and San Angelo markets are broadcast live from KINT's studios.

Technical information

Subchannels
The station's digital signal is multiplexed:

On March 16, 2010, KINT's main channel was upgraded to 1080i high definition in order to allow the carriage of Univision programming produced in the format. The station also added a second digital subchannel, carrying a simulcast of sister station KTFN. On December 3, 2010, the KTFN simulcast was replaced with LATV on KINT subchannel 26.2 and KTFN digital channel 65.2. The following week, the SD simulcast of KTFN was restored on the second subchannels of both stations, with LATV being moved to digital subchannels 26.3 and 65.3. For a brief period prior to the digital television transition, the station's second digital subchannel falsely identified itself as "KINT-HD," while it was still only available in 480i standard definition. As of June 12, they have corrected the problem.

Analog-to-digital conversion
KINT-TV shut down its analog signal, over UHF channel 26, at noon on June 12, 2009, the official date in which full-power television stations in the United States transitioned from analog to digital broadcasts under federal mandate. The station's digital signal remained on its pre-transition UHF channel 25. Through the use of PSIP, digital television receivers display the station's virtual channel as its former UHF analog channel 26. After regular programming was discontinued on its analog signal, the station, as well as sister station KTFN, transmitted a repeated crawl in Spanish informing viewers about the digital transition and advising viewers of their options to continue receiving programming, which ran until KINT permanently ceased analog transmissions at 11:59 p.m.

References

External links

Univision network affiliates
Grit (TV network) affiliates
LATV affiliates
Bounce TV affiliates
Television channels and stations established in 1984
INT-TV
Spanish-language television stations in Texas
1984 establishments in Texas
Entravision Communications stations